Michael J. Ramone (born July 11, 1961) is an American politician from the state of Delaware. A member of the Republican Party, Ramone was elected to the Delaware House of Representatives in 2008.

Electoral history
In 2008, Ramone won the general election against Democratic candidate Patricia Creedon.
In 2010, Ramone won the general election unopposed.
In 2012, Ramone won the general election unopposed.
In 2014, Ramone won the general election against Green candidate David A. McCorquodale.
In 2016, Ramone won a rematch against McCorquodale in the general election.
In 2018, Ramone won the general election against Democratic candidate Stephanie Barry.
In 2020, Ramone won the general election against Democratic candidate Stephanie Barry.
In the 2022 general election, Ramone defeated Democratic candidate Dr. Frank Burns by a total of 35 votes where 8,725 votes were cast.

References

External links
Official page at the Delaware General Assembly
Campaign site
 

1961 births
Living people
Republican Party members of the Delaware House of Representatives
People from Wilmington, Delaware
University of Delaware alumni
21st-century American politicians